A594 road may refer to:

 A594 road (Leicester), Leicester's inner ring road
 A594 road (Cumbria), leads from Maryport  to Cockermouth